"Why Have You Left the One You Left Me For" is a song written by Mark True, and recorded by American country music artist Crystal Gayle.  It was released in October 1978 as the second single from the album When I Dream.  The song was Gayle's sixth number one on the country chart.  The single stayed at number one for two weeks (Jan. 26 & Feb. 3, 1979) and spent a total of ten weeks on  the country chart.

Charts

Weekly charts

Year-end charts

References

External links
 

1978 singles
Crystal Gayle songs
Song recordings produced by Allen Reynolds
United Artists Records singles
1978 songs